Syed Ashraful Haq is a former Bangladeshi cricketer.  He was the architect of Bangladesh's first ever ICC Trophy victory, over Fiji in May 1979.  His 7/23 from 9.2 overs completely destroyed the Fiji middle order, leading Bangladesh to a 22 run win. He was also a member of the Bangladesh side that played in the historic match at Dhaka against the MCC in January 1977. A right hand batsman and an off break bowler, Ashraful remained an integral part of the national side until his retirement in 1981–82 season.

ICC Trophy
The Water Orton Cricket Club ground, in Birmingham, was the unlikely setting for Bangladesh's first-ever international cricket match abroad. On May 24, 1979, Bangladesh played against Fiji in the first ICC Trophy tournament. Bangladesh were the firm favorites, yet batting first they only scored 103 all out. An upset looked on the cards, until Syed Ashraful came on to bowl. The magic of his spin completely mesmerized the Pacific islanders. From 40/2, Fiji collapsed to 81 all out. It was at that time the best figures for a Bangladeshi bowler in international cricket, until Obaidul Haq Azam improved the figures with his 7/18 against the MCC. It was also the record for best bowling in the ICC Trophy. Ole Mortensen, the Danish and Derbyshire fast bowler improved the figures with 7/19 against Israel in Kenya, 1994.

Ashraful had an impressive ICC Trophy with both bat and ball. He used his long experience in English conditions to great effect. As well as his success with the ball, he played several useful innings: 23 against Canada, 22 against Malaysia and 31 against Denmark.

Other international matches
He was a part of the Bangladesh team that played in the historical game against the MCC at Dhaka in January 1977. He failed in the match, but he did score 68 for East Zone at Chittagong. In fact, he seemed to have a special liking for Chittagong. A year later, against test standard Sri Lankan side he scored 42 and 49, and captured 2 wickets for 70 runs at Chittagong.

He retired from international cricket after the 1981–82 season.

In domestic cricket
He played most of his club cricket at Dhaka with the Azad Boys club. In national cricket, he became the first player to score a double hundred, scoring 214 for Bangladesh Shipping Corporation in 1981–82 season.

As a cricket administrator
Syed Ashraful Haque is currently the chief executive officer of the Asian Cricket Council.

See also
Marylebone Cricket Club cricket team in Bangladesh in 1976-77
Sri Lankan cricket team in Bangladesh in 1977-78
1979 ICC Trophy

References

Bangladeshi cricketers
Living people
Dacca University cricketers
East Pakistan cricketers
East Pakistan Whites cricketers
Cricketers from Dhaka
Bangladeshi cricket administrators
Year of birth missing (living people)
St. Gregory's High School and College alumni